State Road 103 (NM 103) is a state highway in the US state of New Mexico. NM 103's western terminus is NM 32 and the eastern terminus is where the state maintenance ends by Quemado Lake.

Major intersections

See also

References

103
Transportation in Catron County, New Mexico